= Tatapudi =

- Village
- Interactive map of Tatapudi
- Location in Andhra Pradesh, India Tatapudi (India)
- Coordinates: 16.761235°N 81.900394°E
- Country: India
- State: Andhra Pradesh

Languages
  - Official: Telugu
- Time zone: UTC+5:30 (IST)

Tatapudi (also spelled Taatapudi) is a small village located on the bay of the Godavari River. Tatapudi village is belonging to Ramachandara Puram Taluka in East Godavari district in Andhra Pradesh State of India.According to the district administration, the village (listed as Thatapudi) falls under Kapileswarapuram mandal in the Ramachandrapuram revenue division of Dr. B.R. Ambedkar Konaseema district.
